Crazy is a R&B love song by duo K-Ci & JoJo. It was released in 2001 and was their first single off the album X. It was also featured on the soundtrack to the hit dance film Save the Last Dance, starring Julia Stiles and Sean Patrick Thomas. The song is notable for making prominent use of auto-tune years before it became popular.

Lyrical content 
The official music video shows what "Crazy" is about. It is about a lover who ruminates over the poor choices he made that caused his girlfriend to break up with him. The song talks about losing sleep over it and after realizing the pain he has caused his girlfriend, he must choose between her and his life as a criminal. Once he chooses his criminal friends over her, he eventually regrets his decision and wishes to return to her.

Credits 
Adapted from X liner notes.
 Darrell Delite – producer, writer, other instruments, vocoder, mixer
 K-Ci Hailey – writer, vocals
 JoJo Hailey – writer, vocals
 Paul Pesco – guitar
 Zak Sulam – guitar
 Brian Kinkead – recording
 J. Rea – recording
 Ben Arrindell – mixer
 Matt – Pro Tools engineer

Charts

Year-end charts

References

2001 singles
K-Ci & JoJo songs
2000 songs
MCA Records singles
Songs written by Darrell "Delite" Allamby
Torch songs
Contemporary R&B ballads
Songs written by K-Ci